Senator Nelson may refer to:

Members of the Northern Irish Senate
Thomas Nelson (Northern Ireland politician) (1888–1954), Northern Irish Senator from 1945 to 1949

Members of the United States Senate
Arthur E. Nelson (1892–1955), U.S. Senator from Minnesota from 1942 to 1943
Ben Nelson (born 1941), U.S. Senator from Nebraska from 2001 to 2013
Bill Nelson (born 1942), U.S. Senator from Florida from 2001 to 2019
Gaylord Nelson (1916–2005), U.S. Senator from Wisconsin from 1963 to 1981
Knute Nelson (1843–1923), U.S. Senator from Minnesota from 1895 to 1923; also served in the Minnesota State Senate

United States state senate members
Carla Nelson (born 1957), Minnesota State Senate
Carolyn Nelson (politician) (born 1937), North Dakota State Senate
David Nelson (Oregon politician) (born 1941), Oregon State Senate
Earl E. Nelson (1937–2016), Michigan State Senate
Gary A. Nelson (born 1930s), Washington State Senate
Henry C. Nelson (1836–1909), New York State Senate
Homer Augustus Nelson (1829–1891), New York State Senate
Howard I. Nelson (1912–2008), Minnesota State Senate
Hugh Nelson (Virginia politician) (1768–1836), Virginia State Senate
Jane Nelson (born 1951), Texas State Senate
John B. Nelson (born 1936), Arizona State Senate
John E. Nelson (Nebraska politician) (born 1935), Nebraska State Senate
Pam Nelson (born 1946), South Dakota State Senate
Philip Nelson (Wisconsin politician) (1891–?), Wisconsin State Senate
Roger Nelson (politician) (1759–1815), Maryland State Senate
Sharon Nelson, Washington State Senate
Socrates Nelson (1814–1867), Minnesota State Senate
Sydney B. Nelson (born 1935), Louisiana State Senate
William Nelson (Wisconsin politician) (1839–1913), Wisconsin  State Senate

Others
Ted S. Nelson (born 1935), Senator from Guam
Telena Cruz Nelson (born 1980), Senator from Guam

See also
Ancher Nelsen (1904–1992), Minnesota State Senate